In philosophy of science and epistemology, the demarcation problem is the question of how to distinguish between science and non-science. It examines the boundaries between science, pseudoscience and other products of human activity, like art and literature and beliefs. The debate continues after over two millennia of dialogue among philosophers of science and scientists in various fields. The debate has consequences for what can be called "scientific" in fields such as education and public policy.

The ancient world
An early attempt at demarcation can be seen in the efforts of Greek natural philosophers and medical practitioners to distinguish their methods and their accounts of nature from the mythological or mystical accounts of their predecessors and contemporaries.

G. E. R. Lloyd noted that there was a sense in which the groups engaged in various forms of inquiry into nature set out to "legitimate their own positions", laying "claim to a new kind of wisdom ... that purported to yield superior enlightenment, even superior practical effectiveness". Medical writers in the Hippocratic tradition maintained that their discussions were based on necessary demonstrations, a theme developed by Aristotle in his Posterior Analytics. One element of this polemic for science was an insistence on a clear and unequivocal presentation of arguments, rejecting the imagery, analogy, and myth of the old wisdom. Some of their claimed naturalistic explanations of phenomena have been found to be quite fanciful, with little reliance on actual observations.

Cicero's De Divinatione implicitly used five criteria of scientific demarcation that are also used by modern philosophers of science.

Logical positivism

Logical positivism, formulated in the 1920s, held that only statements about matters of fact or logical relations between concepts are meaningful. All other statements lack sense and are labelled "metaphysics" (see the verifiability theory of meaning also known as verificationism).

According to A. J. Ayer, metaphysicians make statements which claim to have "knowledge of a reality which [transcends] the phenomenal world". Ayer, a member of the Vienna Circle and a noted English logical-positivist, argued that making any statements about the world beyond one's immediate sense-perception is impossible. This is because even metaphysicians' first premises will necessarily begin with observations made through sense-perception.

Ayer implied that the line of demarcation is characterized as the place at which statements become "factually significant". To be "factually significant", a statement must be verifiable. In order to be verifiable, the statement must be verifiable in the observable world, or facts that can be induced from "derived experience". This is referred to as the "verifiability" criterion.

This distinction between science, which in the view of the Vienna Circle possessed empirically verifiable statements, and what they pejoratively called "metaphysics", which lacked such statements, can be seen as representing another aspect of the demarcation problem. Logical positivism is often discussed in the context of the demarcation between science and non-science or pseudoscience. However, "The verificationist proposals had the aim of solving a distinctly different demarcation problem, namely that between science and metaphysics."

Falsifiability

Karl Popper saw demarcation as a central problem in the philosophy of science. Popper articulates the problem of demarcation as:

Falsifiability is the demarcation criterion proposed by Popper as opposed to verificationism: "statements or systems of statements, in order to be ranked as scientific, must be capable of conflicting with possible, or conceivable observations".

Against verifiability
Popper rejected solutions to the problem of demarcation that are grounded in inductive reasoning, and so rejected logical-positivist responses to the problem of demarcation. He argued that logical-positivists want to create a demarcation between the metaphysical and the empirical because they believe that empirical claims are meaningful and metaphysical ones are not. Unlike the Vienna Circle, Popper stated that his proposal was not a criterion of "meaningfulness".

Popper argued that the Humean induction problem shows that there is no way to make meaningful universal statements on the basis of any number of empirical observations. Therefore, empirical statements are no more "verifiable" than metaphysical statements.

This creates a problem for the line of demarcation the positivists wanted to cleave between the empirical and the metaphysical. By their very own "verifiability criterion", Popper argued, the empirical is subsumed into the metaphysical, and the line of demarcation between the two becomes non-existent.

The solution of falsifiability
In Popper's later work, he stated that falsifiability is both a necessary and sufficient criterion for demarcation. He described falsifiability as a property of "the logical structure of sentences and classes of sentences", so that a statement's scientific or non-scientific status does not change over time. This has been summarized as a statement being falsifiable "if and only if it logically contradicts some (empirical) sentence that describes a logically possible event that it would be logically possible to observe".

Kuhnian postpositivism
Thomas Kuhn, an American historian and philosopher of science, is often connected with what has been called postpositivism or postempiricism. In his 1962 book The Structure of Scientific Revolutions, Kuhn divided the process of doing science into two different endeavors, which he called normal science and extraordinary science (sometimes called "revolutionary science"), the latter of which introduces a new "paradigm" that solves new problems while continuing to provide solutions to the problems solved by the preceding paradigm.

Popper criticized Kuhn's demarcation criterion, saying that astrologers are engaged in puzzle solving, and that therefore Kuhn's criterion recognized astrology as a science. He stated that Kuhn's criterion leads to a "major disaster ... [the] replacement of a rational criterion of science by a sociological one".

Feyerabend and Lakatos
Kuhn's work largely called into question Popper's demarcation, and emphasized the human, subjective quality of scientific change. Paul Feyerabend was concerned that the very question of demarcation was insidious: science itself had no need of a demarcation criterion, but instead some philosophers were seeking to justify a special position of authority from which science could dominate public discourse. Feyerabend argued that science does not in fact occupy a special place in terms of either its logic or method, and no claim to special authority made by scientists can be upheld. He argued that, within the history of scientific practice, no rule or method can be found that has not been violated or circumvented at some point in order to advance scientific knowledge. Both Imre Lakatos and Feyerabend suggest that science is not an autonomous form of reasoning, but is inseparable from the larger body of human thought and inquiry.

Thagard
Paul R. Thagard proposed another set of principles to try to overcome these difficulties, and argued that it is important for society to find a way of doing so. According to Thagard's method, a theory is not scientific if it satisfies two conditions:
 The theory has been less progressive than alternative theories over a long period of time, and faces many unsolved problems; and...
 The community of practitioners makes little attempt to develop the theory towards solutions of the problems, shows no concern for attempts to evaluate the theory in relation to others, and is selective in considering confirmations and disconfirmations.

Thagard specified that sometimes theories will spend some time as merely "unpromising" before they truly deserve the title of pseudoscience. He cited astrology as an example: it was stagnant compared to advances in physics during the 17th century, and only later became "pseudoscience" in the advent of alternative explanations provided by psychology during the 19th century.

Thagard also stated that his criteria should not be interpreted so narrowly as to allow willful ignorance of alternative explanations, or so broadly as to discount our modern science compared to science of the future. His definition is a practical one, which generally seeks to distinguish pseudoscience as areas of inquiry which are stagnant and without active scientific investigation.

Some historians' perspectives
Many historians of science are concerned with the development of science from its primitive origins; consequently they define science in sufficiently broad terms to include early forms of natural knowledge. In the article on science in the eleventh edition of the Encyclopædia Britannica, the scientist and historian William Cecil Dampier Whetham defined science as "ordered knowledge of natural phenomena and of the relations between them". In his study of Greek science, Marshall Clagett defined science as "first, the orderly and systematic comprehension, description and/or explanation of natural phenomena and, secondly, the [mathematical and logical] tools necessary for the undertaking". A similar definition appeared more recently in David Pingree's study of early science: "Science is a systematic explanation of perceived or imaginary phenomena, or else is based on such an explanation. Mathematics finds a place in science only as one of the symbolical languages in which scientific explanations may be expressed." These definitions tend to focus more on the subject matter of science than on its method and from these perspectives, the philosophical concern to establish a line of demarcation between science and non-science becomes "problematic, if not futile".

Laudan
Larry Laudan concluded, after examining various historical attempts to establish a demarcation criterion, that "philosophy has failed to deliver the goods" in its attempts to distinguish science from non-science—to distinguish science from pseudoscience. None of the past attempts would be accepted by a majority of philosophers nor, in his view, should they be accepted by them or by anyone else. He stated that many well-founded beliefs are not scientific and, conversely, many scientific conjectures are not well-founded. Advancing a number of examples from everyday practice of football and carpentry and non-scientific scholarship such as literary criticism and philosophy, he saw the question of whether a belief is well-founded or not to be more practically and philosophically significant than whether it is scientific or not. In his judgment, the demarcation between science and non-science was a pseudo-problem that would best be replaced by focusing on the distinction between reliable and unreliable knowledge, without bothering to ask whether that knowledge is scientific or not. He would consign phrases like "pseudo-science" or "unscientific" to the rhetoric of politicians or sociologists.

After Laudan
Others have disagreed with Laudan. Sebastian Lutz, for example, argued that demarcation does not have to be a single necessary and sufficient condition as Laudan implied. Rather, Laudan's reasoning at the most establishes that there has to be one necessary criterion and one possibly different sufficient criterion. 

Various typologies or taxonomies of sciences versus nonsciences, and reliable knowledge versus illusory knowledge, have been proposed. Ian Hacking, Massimo Pigliucci, and others have noted that the sciences generally conform to Ludwig Wittgenstein's concept of family resemblances.

Other critics have argued for multiple demarcation criteria, some suggesting that there should be one set of criteria for the natural sciences, another set of criteria for the social sciences, and claims involving the supernatural could have a set of pseudoscientific criteria.

Significance
Concerning science education, Michael D. Gordin wrote:

Discussions of the demarcation problem highlight the rhetoric of science and promote critical thinking. Citizens thinking critically, and expressing themselves with reasoned argument in policy discussion, contribute to enlightened democracy. For example, Gordin stated: "Demarcation remains essential for the enormously high political stakes of climate-change denial and other anti-regulatory fringe doctrines".

Philosopher  noted:

Concern for informed human nutrition sparked the following note in 1942:

The demarcation problem has been compared to the problem of differentiating fake news from real news, which rose to prominence in the 2016 United States presidential election.

See also

 Boundary-work
 Idealism
 Relativism
 Scientism

References

Philosophy of science
Science studies
Religion and science
Dichotomies
Philosophical problems